Catherine Jacob (born 16 December 1956) is a French film and theatrical actress who has won the César Award.

Career

She won the César Award for Most Promising Actress for her role in Life Is a Long Quiet River (1988), and was nominated for Best Supporting Actress in Tatie Danielle (1990), Merci la vie (1991) and Neuf mois (1994). She has won one César Award on four nominations. She has been two-time president of the Lumières Award. She is known for her voice and her charisma.

1980–1987: beginning

Born in Paris on 16 December 1956, Catherine Jacob spent part of her childhood and adolescence in Compiègne, where she was educated at primary school and then Pierre d'Ailly high school. Her father was a dental surgeon and her mother an orthodontist. She has a younger brother.

After obtaining a diploma in architecture, Catherine Jacob moved to Paris. From 1978 to 1980, she studied acting at the Cours Florent, then located on Saint Louis Island.

She started to act in the early 1980s as an extra in movies like Swann in Love by Volker Schlöndorff (1984), Les Nanas by Annick Lanoë (1985), State of Grace by Jacques Rouffio (1986) and Malady of Love by Jacques Deray (1987). She also appeared in TV movies and TV series like Dickie-roi by Guy Lefranc, Toutes griffes dehors by Michel Boisrond, Julien Fontanes, magistrat, Marie Pervenche, Sentiments and Qui c'est ce garçon ? by Nadine Trintignant in minor roles.

In 1985, she wrote and play in her first a one-woman show, called Welcome to the club, directed by Rémi Chenylle and tracing eleven portraits of characters too sure of themselves. She appeared in a festival with her show and made a tour with it the following year.

1988–1997: César and success
In 1988 she played Marie-Thérèse in the cult film Life Is a Long Quiet River by Étienne Chatiliez. The movie was a huge success and Jacob won the César Award for Most Promising Actress. She also play in the TV miniseries Le vent des moissons alongside Annie Girardot. This same year she and Jacques Bonnaffé also had a huge success with the play Paris-Nord - Attractions pour noces et banquets. It was planned to be just for 10 nights, but thanks to the success the play continued for three years.

In 1989, she continued her tour with the play Paris-Nord - Attractions pour noces et banquets. She got a supporting role in Les Maris, les Femmes, les Amants by Pascal Thomas, with Jean-François Stévenin and Michel Robin. She starred in two TV movies: L'été de la révolution with Bruno Cremer and Brigitte Fossey and Le vagabond de la Bastille by Michel Andrieu. She also appeared in one episode of the TV series Imogène with Dominique Lavanant.

In 1990, she ended her tour with the play Paris-Nord - Attractions pour noces et banquets after three years. She appeared in the second movie of the director Étienne Chatiliez, Tatie Danielle with Tsilla Chelton, Isabelle Nanty and Karin Viard. It was shown at the Toronto International Film Festival. The movie was again a big success at the box office, well received by the critics and became a cult movie. Jacob was nominated for the César Award for Best Supporting Actress.

In 1991, she starred in The Imaginary Invalid by Molière, directed by Hans-Peter Cloos at the Théâtre national de Chaillot. She have a supporting role in Merci la vie by Bertrand Blier, alongside Charlotte Gainsbourg, Anouk Grinberg, Michel Blanc, Jean Carmet, Annie Girardot, Jean-Louis Trintignant and Gérard Depardieu. Jacob was nominated for her third César Award for Best Supporting Actress. She appeared in My Father the Hero by Gérard Lauzier, with Gérard Depardieu, Marie Gillain and Charlotte de Turckheim. She was also in the short Contes à rebours, directed by Gilles Porte.

In 1992, she star in two new plays: Ubu Roi by Alfred Jarry, directed by Roland Topor at the Théâtre national de Chaillot, and Chambres by Philippe Minyana, directed by Hans-Peter Cloos at the Théâtre Paris-Villette. She played Rose in La Fille de l'air by Maroun Bagdadi, with Béatrice Dalle, Hippolyte Girardot and Jean-Claude Dreyfus. She's also  in Bella vista by Alfredo Arias, with Wadeck Stanczak. Jacob was in three shorts, Tout petit déjà by David Carayon, O mon amour with Artus de Penguern and Cocon by Martin Provost.

In 1993, she starred in the successful La Soif de l'or by Gérard Oury, with Tsilla Chelton and Christian Clavier. She appeared in the short Stella plage with Dominique Pinon and in the TV movie L'Éternel Mari by Denys Granier-Deferre, with Roger Hanin and Macha Méril.

In 1994, she played Dominique in the cult film Neuf mois by Patrick Braoudé, with Daniel Russo. Jacob was again nominated for the César Award for Best Supporting Actress. She had the leading role in Les Braqueuses by Jean-Paul Salomé, with Clémentine Célarié and in Oh God, Women Are So Loving by Magali Clément, with Mathieu Carrière. She play in the TV movie Le jardin des plantes by Philippe de Broca, with Claude Rich. She also started in a new play written and directed by Victor Lanoux, called Drame au Concert with Roland Giraud. She and Lanoux didn't get along at all, and she called him a "filthy guy" and "a shithead" and was forced by her contract to do 130 representations. She recall the experience as "a nightmare" and regretted having accepted the role since she had to refuse the role of "La Pinthade" in Chantecler directed by Jérôme Savary with who she will later work with.

In 1995, she work for the third time with director Étienne Chatiliez, in the big success Happiness Is in the Field, alongside Michel Serrault, Eddy Mitchell, Sabine Azéma and Carmen Maura. She was also in the TV movie Les maîtresses de mon mari with Marie-Christine Barrault.

In 1996, she came back to the theater with Le Bourgeois gentilhomme by Molière, directed by Jérôme Savary, at the Théâtre national de Chaillot. She played the diva Carla Milo in Les Grands Ducs by Patrice Leconte, with Jean-Pierre Marielle, Philippe Noiret, Jean Rochefort and Michel Blanc. She starred in the movie Oui by Alexandre Jardin, with Dany Boon, Jean-Marie Bigard and Claire Keim, and in Let's Hope it Lasts with Ticky Holgado and Gérard Darmon. She was in two shorts: Un bel après-midi d'été by Artus de Penguern and Ultima hora with François Berléand. She also made two TV movies, Sur un air de mambo by Jean-Louis Bertucelli, for which she became the first French woman to win the Golden Goblet Award for Best Actress, and Barrage sur l'Orénoque with Elizabeth Bourgine and Georges Corraface.

In 1997, she was in Messieurs les enfants, with Pierre Arditi, François Morel, Zinedine Soualem and Michel Aumont, in XXL by Ariel Zeitoun, with Michel Boujenah, Gérard Depardieu, Elsa Zylberstein, Emmanuelle Riva and Gad Elmaleh, and in La ballade de Titus with Jean-Claude Dreyfus and Antoine Duléry. She also had the leading role in two TV movies: Maintenant ou jamais with Daniel Russo, Samy Naceri and Chantal Lauby and La vie à trois with Aurélien Recoing.

1998–2011: television and festival

In 1998, she is cast in Let There Be Light by Arthur Joffé, an ensemble comedy. She was in three TV movies: Théo et Marie with Véronique Jannot, Qui mange qui ? with Julien Guiomar and Maintenant et pour toujours with Marisa Berenson, Marlène Jobert and Agathe de La Boulaye. She also appeared in one episode of Chercheur d'héritiers with Bernadette Lafont.

In 1999, she play in the TV movie Fleurs de sel with François Berléand and Frédéric Pierrot. She appeared in one episode of the TV series Marc Eliot, directed by Josée Dayan. She came back to theater after 3 years, with The Miser by Molière, directed by Jérôme Savary at the Théâtre des Célestins. She was invited to present an award at the 13th Molière Award.

In 2000, she started a tour in France with The Miser by Molière. She starred in Le coeur à l'ouvrage, with Mathilde Seigner and Amira Casar. She had the leading role in two TV movies: La Double Vie de Jeanne with Micheline Presle and Christine Citti, and Les faux-fuyants, with Arielle Dombasle and Nicolas Vaude.

In 2001, she had the leading role in the movie J'ai faim !!!, directed by Florence Quentin, with Michèle Laroque. The movie was shown during the Yokohama French Film Festival, in Japan. She starred in the movie God Is Great and I'm Not with Audrey Tautou, Édouard Baer, Julie Depardieu, Philippe Laudenbach and Thierry Neuvic. It was screened at the Seattle International Film Festival. She was also in the short, La concierge est dans l'ascenseur, with Michel Vuillermoz, Omar Sy and Fred Testot.

In 2002, she star in the TV movies La torpille, with Pierre Cassignard and the sequel of Qui mange qui ?, called Qui mange quoi ?, directed by Jean-Paul Lilienfeld. Jacob also gave her voice to the animated TV miniseries Corto Maltese, with Richard Berry, Patrick Bouchitey and Marie Trintignant.

In 2003, she appeared in Who Killed Bambi?, directed by Gilles Marchand, with Sophie Quinton, Laurent Lucas, Yasmine Belmadi, Valérie Donzelli and Joséphine de Meaux. The movie was screened at the Cannes Film Festival, the Toronto International Film Festival, the Seattle International Film Festival and some others. She starred in two TV movies: L'adieu, with Thomas Jouannet, Mélanie Doutey, Gilles Lellouche, Jean Benguigui, and Cécile Cassel, and L'île atlantique by Gérard Mordillat. Jacob was member of the jury to the Festival international du film fantastique de Gérardmer, presided by William Friedkin.

In 2004, she was in The First Time I Turned Twenty by Lorraine Lévy, with Marilou Berry, Serge Riaboukine, Pierre Arditi, Raphaël Personnaz and Michel Vuillermoz. The movie was presented to the San Francisco Jewish Film Festival, the San Diego Jewish Film Festival and the Women Make Waves Festival. She had a role in the animated short La Méthode Bourchnikov with Lorànt Deutsch, Dieudonné M'bala M'bala and Daniel Prévost. The short was presented to the Clermont-Ferrand International Short Film Festival, the CFC Worldwide Short Film Festival and several others. It was nominated for the César Award for Best Short Film. She have the leading role in the third and last of the TV movies Qui mange quand ?, directed by Jean-Paul Lilienfeld. She also starred in the TV movie Joe Pollox et les mauvais esprits with Pascal Légitimus and Laurent Lafitte and in the TV miniseries Colette, une femme libre directed by Nadine Trintignant, with Marie Trintignant and Lambert Wilson. She began a new TV series, Clara et associés directed by Gérard Marx, with François Berléand and Antoine Duléry.

In 2005, she starred in Quartier V.I.P. by Laurent Firode, with Johnny Hallyday, Pascal Légitimus, Valeria Bruni Tedeschi, François Berléand and Jean-Claude Brialy. She had roles in three TV movies: Une vie by Élisabeth Rappeneau, with Wladimir Yordanoff and Barbara Schulz, Louise, with Huguette Oligny and Désiré Landru with Patrick Timsit and Danièle Lebrun. She also appeared in one episode of the TV series Vénus & Apollon with Zinedine Soualem and Maria de Medeiros. She was a member of the jury of the 16th Valenciennes Film Festival and she was invited to the Marrakech International Film Festival.

In 2006, she was in Dikkenek with Jean-Luc Couchard, Dominique Pinon, Marion Cotillard, Mélanie Laurent, Jérémie Renier, Florence Foresti and François Damiens and in Les Aristos by Charlotte de Turckheim, with Jacques Weber, Urbain Cancelier, Armelle, Victoria Abril and Rossy de Palma. She starred in four TV movies: Comment lui dire by Laurent Firode, Mes parents chéris with Adriana Asti and Michel Aumont, L'enfant d'une autre with Arly Jover and Olivier Marchal and Le Soldat rose with Matthieu Chedid, Louis Chedid, Alain Souchon, Vanessa Paradis and Francis Cabrel. She also appeared in the TV miniseries Le Cri with Francis Renaud, Jacques Bonnaffé, Dominique Blanc, Yolande Moreau and François Morel. She was a member of the jury of the 20th Cabourg Film Festival.

In 2007, she came back to the theater after seven years of break with the play Jusqu'à ce que la mort nous sépare by Rémi de Vos, directed by Éric Vigner, at the Théâtre du Rond-Point. She was in the short Kozak, directed by Olivier Fox, with Fred Testot. She was invited to present two awards during the 32nd César Awards. She was also on the stage for the Victoires de la Musique with the band of Le Soldat Rose to sing. She was invited to give the Prix Cine Romen alongside Claude Lelouch and Pierre Lescure.

In 2008, she started in a new play, Célibataires by David Foenkinos, directed by Anouche Setbon, at the Théâtre des Champs-Élysées. She starred in the drama Behind the Walls, directed by Christian Faure, with Carole Bouquet, François Damiens, Michel Jonasz, Guillaume Gouix and Pascal N'Zonzi. It was the movie premiere to the City of Lights, City of Angels Festival. She play in 48 heures par jour by Catherine Castel, with Aure Atika, Antoine de Caunes, Victoria Abril, Bernadette Lafont and Aurore Clément. She also had the leading part in the TV movie La Maison Tellier, directed by Élisabeth Rappeneau, with Bruno Lochet and Sophie Quinton. She also she gave her voice to Brigitte, the teacher of Eliot Kid in the first season of the TV Series. She was a member of the jury of the 15th Festival international du film fantastique de Gérardmer. She was invited to the third ceremony of the Raimu of Comedy.

In 2009, she appeared in the short L'arbre à clous, directed by Fabrice Couchard and presented to the Brussels International Independent Film Festival. She was invited to the 23rd Molière Award to present the Best Supporting Actress with Michel Vuillermoz. She was invited to give the Prix Cine Romen for the second time, alongside Patrice Leconte and Jean-Pierre Marielle.

In 2010, she played Chantal in Thelma, Louise et Chantal, with Jane Birkin, Caroline Cellier, Thierry Lhermitte, Michèle Bernier, Alysson Paradis and Micheline Presle. The movie premiered to the Alpe d'Huez Film Festival and was also screened during the Edinburgh International Film Festival. She starred in Streamfield, les carnets noirs, with Bernard Le Coq, Jean-Pierre Castaldi and Pierre Arditi. She had roles in two TV movies: Notre Dame des Barjots with Zabou Breitman and Pierre Cassignard and He's the One... Or Not with Delphine Chanéac and Sagamore Stévenin. For the third time, she was invited to give the Prix Cine Romen alongside Marie-Anne Chazel and Jean-Loup Dabadie. She was a part of the ceremony at the Culture Ministry in Paris honoring her friend Daniel Russo. She was a member of the jury during the 10th Monte Carlo Comedy Film Festival.

In 2011, she have a supporting role in Roses à crédit, directed by Amos Gitai, with Léa Seydoux, Grégoire Leprince-Ringuet, Pierre Arditi, Arielle Dombasle, Valeria Bruni Tedeschi, Florence Thomassin, André Wilms, Ariane Ascaride and Elsa Zylberstein. The movie was presented at the Toronto International Film Festival, the São Paulo International Film Festival and the Morelia International Film Festival. She starred in the horror movie Livid directed by Julien Maury and Alexandre Bustillo, with Félix Moati, Marie-Claude Pietragalla and Béatrice Dalle. The movie premiered at the Toronto International Film Festival, and was presented in many festivals like the Strasbourg European Fantastic Film Festival, the Fantastic Fest and the Screamfest Horror Film Festival. She appeared in three TV movies: Gérald K. Gérald by Élisabeth Rappeneau, with François Morel and Armelle, Le Grand Restaurant II with Line Renaud and Le client with Gérard Darmon. She was invited to the Chaumet's Cocktail Party for Cesar's Revelations 2011 where she supported Arthur Dupont, and a couple weeks later she was invited to the announcement of the nominees. She was a member of the jury during the 16th International Film Festival of young directors with Myriam Boyer, Virginie Efira and Stéphane Brizé. She also host the 50th Gala des Artistes.

2012–present: theater, television and cinema

In 2012, she played in two TV movies:  directed by Stéphane Clavier, with Lionel Abelanski, Christine Citti and Macha Méril and La Baie d'Alger, screened at the Alès Film Festival, directed by Merzak Allouache, with Biyouna, Jean Benguigui and Michèle Moretti. She also appeared in three episodes of the TV series Victoire Bonnot, with Valérie Damidot. She was chosen to preside at the 17th Lumières Awards.

In 2013, she was back in theater with a tour after five years, in Le voyageur sans bagage by Jean Anouilh, directed by Alain Fromager and Gwendoline Hamon. She starred in two TV movies: Je vous présente ma femme, directed by Élisabeth Rappeneau, with Michel Robin and Les Vieux Calibres with Danièle Lebrun, Michel Aumont, Roger Dumas and Jean-Luc Bideau. She had two recurring roles in two TV series: Vive la colo ! with Virginie Hocq, Titoff, Julien Boisselier and Luce for four episodes and La Famille Katz with Julie Depardieu and Serge Hazanavicius for six episodes. She also made an advertisement for LCL S.A.

In 2014, she played two supporting roles in two movies: L'Ex de ma vie with Géraldine Nakache and Kim Rossi Stuart, and Lili Rose with Mehdi Dehbi. She also starred in the TV movie Tout est permis, directed by Émilie Deleuze, with Judith Chemla. She appeared in a couple of episodes of Scènes de ménages, playing the daughter of Marion Game and Gérard Hernandez's characters. She has also shot advertisements for Canalsat.

In 2015, she starred in two TV movies: Lettre à France directed by Stéphane Clavier, with Julie Ferrier and Merci pour tout, Charles with Charlotte de Turckheim and Claudia Tagbo for France 2. She also appeared in two episodes of the TV series Nos chers voisins for TF1. Catherine Jacob was also on stage with Madame in which she played a prostitute who tells her memoirs. She was alone on stage and her performance was hailed by critics. She's also a part of the show Elles se croient toutes Joly with other actresses to pay tribute to the comedian Sylvie Joly. In April, she read on stage some letters of the Royallieu-Compiègne internment camp's deportees.

In 2016, she appeared in Joséphine s'arrondit directed by Marilou Berry. She also starred in three TV movies: Murders at Avignon, with Lætitia Milot for France 3, Baisers cachés with Patrick Timsit, and 3 Mariages et 1 coup de foudre with Helena Noguerra and Mylène Demongeot for France 2. In the theater, she appeared in L'impresario delle Smirne written by Carlo Goldoni, with Nicolas Vaude. She also joined the TV show Conseil d'indiscipline, broadcast on Paris Première and hosted by Jean-Louis Debré for which she was a columnist for a couple of shows. In April, she was the godmother of the 19th Dinard Comedy Festival.

In 2017, she starred as Queen Titania in Un jour mon prince! with Hugo Becker and in the comedy Baby Bumps with Juliette Binoche. Sha also played Agnès Dorgelle in This Is Our Land, directed by Lucas Belvaux, with Émilie Dequenne, André Dussollier and Guillaume Gouix. The film was slated to be released two months before the first round of the 2017 presidential elections in France and directly targets the National Front. The character portrayed by Catherine Jacob is said to strongly resemble Marine Le Pen, and members of the political party saw the film as an affront. Steeve Briois, the FN mayor of Hénin-Beaumont tweeted: "Poor Marine Le Pen, who is caricatured by this tobacco pot of Catherine Jacob. A damn turnip in perspective!" Florian Philippot, another member of the FN declared: "According to the trailer that I saw [...], it looks like a nice turnip, but, beyond the quality of the film, I find it really scandalous that in the countryside Presidential election, I believe precisely two months before the vote, one leaves in the French rooms a film that is clearly anti-National Front. [...] It disturbs me on behalf of Catherine Jacob. I was a fan of Catherine Jacob. There, I love her very much, but for me she is spoiled. Why? For some money, for a César Award, for a little chocolate medal that will be given, for service rendered to the system?". Jacob answered: The stupid reaction of the National Front is a gift. It proves our point...

Later in 2017, she returned to the stage with the play Madame for a successful tour. The same year, she also starred in the leading role of the adaptation of Un fil à la patte, written by Georges Feydeau and directed by Christophe Lidon, who directed her the year before, in L'impresario delle Smirne. This was a new success and the play was back on stage with Jacob in May 2018 at the Théâtre Montparnasse.

In August and September 2017, she shot a new TV miniseries for France 3 called Les impatientes with Noémie Lvovsky and Thierry Godard. She also starred in To Each, Her Own produced by Netflix with Julia Piaton and Richard Berry.

From October 7 to 14, she is one of the jury members of the festival Arte Mare. From December 7 to 10, she was a member of the jury at the 2nd Liège International Comedy Film Festival, alongside Gérard Darmon and Frédéric Diefenthal.

In 2018, she was a spokesperson for IMAGYN during their campaign to encourage cervical cancer screening. She appear in an episode of the fourth season of Nina but also in an episode of Hitchcock by Mocky directed by Jean-Pierre Mocky, for France 2 and France 3. The same year she played "The Fairy Godmother" for 8 short films called "La Fabuleuse Histoire des Caisses d'Epargne" explaining the creation and the evolution of the Groupe Caisse d'Épargne.

The October 15th 2018, Christophe Barratier and Sam Bobino, co-presidents of the Festival du cinéma et de la musique de La Baule, unveiled the composition of the jury that will be chaired by Catherine Jacob. Jacob will be surrounded by the actresses Audrey Fleurot, Axelle Laffont and the composer Mathieu Lamboley, Philippe Kelly and Alex Jaffray, members of the jury. The festival will run from Tuesday 6th to Sunday 11 November.

In 2019, she co-wrote her first book called Hommes/Femmes, ce qu'elles en disent with Franck Leclerc. In March, she received the title of Commander des Ordres des Arts et des Lettres by the French gouvernment for her significantly contribution to the enrichment of the French cultural inheritance.

Theater

Filmography

Box-office 
Movies starring Catherine Jacob with more than a million tickets sold in France.

Television

Author

Participations 
 1998 : Festival international du film de comédie de l'Alpe d'Huez (Jury)
 2003 : 2003 Festival international du film fantastique de Gérardmer (Jury)
 2005 : Festival du film d'aventures de Valenciennes (Jury)
 2006 : Cabourg Film Festival (Jury)
 2008 : 2008 Festival international du film fantastique de Gérardmer (President of the Jury - Short Competition)
 2010 : Festival de Beaune (Jury)
 2011 : Festival international du film de Saint-Jean-de-Luz (President of the Jury)
 2011 : Festival du Film français de Cosne-Cours-sur-Loire (President of the Jury)
 2012 : President of the 17th Lumières Awards
 2012 : Dinard Comedy Festival (President of the Jury)
 2016 : Godmother of the Dinard Comedy Festival
 2017 : Festival international du film de comédie de Liège (Jury)
 2018 : Festival du cinéma et musique de film de La Baule (President of the Jury)
 2019 : Waterloo Historical Film Festival (Jury)
 2019 : Des Notes et des Toiles (President of the Jury)

References

External links

Biographie de Catherine Jacob at Evene.fr

French film actresses
20th-century French actresses
21st-century French actresses
Actresses from Paris
Living people
1956 births
Cours Florent alumni
Most Promising Actress César Award winners
Commandeurs of the Ordre des Arts et des Lettres